Buluan, officially the Municipality of Buluan (Maguindanaon: Inged nu Buluan), is a 4th class municipality and capital of the province of Maguindanao del Sur, Philippines. According to the 2020 census, it has a population of 57,406 people.

The town was recognized by the Sangguniang Panlalawigan of the former Maguindanao province as the new (de jure) provincial capital in 2014, a move seen as the solution to the decades-old issue of Maguindanao's lack of a permanent provincial capitol due to local clan politics. Republic Act No. 11550 officially designated Buluan as the capital of Maguindanao del Sur.

History

Buluan used to comprise a vast area surrounding Lake Buluan when it was created as one of the municipalities of Cotabato on August 8, 1947, by Executive Order No. 82 of Pres. Manuel Roxas. On August 3, 1951, the municipality of Tacurong was created out of its south-western portion.  In 1961, its south-eastern portion was separated to form the municipality of Columbio, six years later its southern portion was made into the municipality of Lutayan. It was made part of the province of Maguindanao on November 22, 1973, at the same time ceding its western coast of Lake Buluan to create the municipality of President Quirino, which was made part of Sultan Kudarat province. Its northern portion was made into the municipality of Gen. S. K. Pendatun on April 7, 1991. Its area was further divided on December 30, 2006, when two more municipalities were created out of its territory namely: Mangudadatu and Pandag, losing 8 barangays (south and north, respectively) to each of the two new towns.

In 2014, the Sangguniang Panlalawigan of Maguindanao passed a resolution naming Buluan the new capital of Maguindanao. Pending the completion of the new capitol complex, the provincial governor Esmael Mangudadatu (a Buluan native) will continue to hold office in the town's Rajah Buayan Silongan Peace Center — originally designated as a mere satellite office of the provincial government when Mangudadatu took office in 2010, but since the official designation of Buluan as provincial capital in 2014 has served as the provisional capitol building. However, the legislative branch of provincial government, the Sangguniang Panlalawigan of Maguindanao, continues to hold sessions in the refurbished buildings of the old provincial capitol in Simuay, Sultan Kudarat, by virtue of Sangguniang Panlalawigan Resolution No. 78 dated May 3, 2011. The old provincial capitol complex, built next to the previous governor's properties in Shariff Aguak, was converted for public use.

Geography

Barangays
Buluan is politically subdivided into 7 barangays.
 Digal
 Lower Siling
 Maslabeng
 Poblacion 
 Popol
 Talitay
 Upper Siling

Climate

Demographics

Economy

References

External links
 Buluan Profile at the DTI Cities and Municipalities Competitive Index
 [ Philippine Standard Geographic Code]
 Philippine Census Information
 Local Governance Performance Management System

Municipalities of Maguindanao del Sur
Provincial capitals of the Philippines
Establishments by Philippine executive order